Monthon Arayangkoon is a Thai film director, screenwriter and producer. His credits include Garuda, the first all-digital Thai film production. His other films include The Victim and The House. He attended Chulalongkorn University, graduating from the Faculty of Education, Department of Art Education.

Filmography

 Garuda (2004)
 The Victim (2006)
 The House (2007)

References

External links

Monthon Arayangkoon
Living people
Monthon Arayangkoon
Monthon Arayangkoon
Monthon Arayangkoon
Year of birth missing (living people)